Jose A. Boedo is a Spanish plasma physicist and a researcher at University of California, San Diego. He is an Elected Fellow of the American Physical Society, which was awarded in 2016 for "his ground-breaking contributions to the studies of plasma drifts and intermittent plasma transport in the peripheral region of tokamaks".

Boedo is best known for pioneering work in the characteristics, particle and energy transport, and dynamics of the edge and scrape-off layer and divertors of tokamaks, the leading candidate device for fusion energy. The most impacting and cited work has been on intermittent transport  and the role of cross-phase in transport modulation by velocity shear.

Early life and career 
Boedo received his Ph.D. from the University of Texas at Austin. In 1990, he joined UCLA as a researcher in the Mechanical and Aerospace Engineering department. In 1995, he moved to the University of California, San Diego and has been there ever since.

Scientific contributions
Early in his career, Boedo investigated the role of externally imposed electric fields on tokamak plasmas, and corresponding velocity shear, in the suppression of turbulence. Although until then, the observed effect of velocity shear on reducing turbulence was consistent with theoretical expectations, causality had not been demonstrated and it was its existence under externally applied electric fields, and concomitant velocity shear, that closed the causality loop. Boedo characterized the reduction of transport and compared the scaling of the suppression with known theories. Additionally, he was the first one to show that velocity shear also reduced temperature fluctuations and therefore, conductive heat flux.

Boedo also investigated the effect that injected impurities on tokamak plasmas had on producing enhanced energy confinement, the so-called I-mode, and was the first to show that the enhancement in performance was due to reduction in transport and turbulence due to ITG mode suppression.

Boedo has also done pioneering work on the role of flows and drifts in the edge, SOL (Scrape-off layer) and divertor of tokamaks. He was the first to demonstrate experimentally that once the divertor plasma is detached, there is a considerable residual heat flux that is convected by the plasma to the walls via large, Mach=1 large scale flows.

It has been original work by Boedo that showed that the effect of ExB drifts in the SOL and divertor plasmas are significant and therefore edge simulation codes such as UEDGE and SOLPS should include drifts to properly model the boundary plasma. Furthermore, Boedo worked closely with modelers in experiment-modeling efforts, to demonstrate the relevance of the drifts.

At some point in the late 1990s it was found in the ALCATOR C-Mod tokamak that plasma-wall contact was much larger than expected, and it then became clear that there was some missing transport mechanism/physics in the edge/SOL in tokamaks. Pioneering work by Boedo, Rudakov, Krashenninikov, et al. quantified, characterized and demonstrated experimentally that plasma was carried form the plasma edge towards the SOL and the chamber walls by intermittent, convective transport, that was then identified as resulting from interchange instability. Boedo is still involved in this topic and work continues as theoretical understanding improves, in particular on the scaling of intermittent transport with plasma parameters.

In parallel, Boedo developed tools to study and characterize Edge Localized Modes (ELMs) at high time resolution. The heat released by ELMs towards the walls of fusion devices is a major concern for future devices. Boedo wrote a seminal paper on quantification of ELM-mediated particle and heat transport that among other results, highlighted the two-dimensional nature of the phenomena as filaments and discovered that such filaments have a complex structure.

The latest work of Boedo has been focused on the physics of intrinsic rotation in tokamaks and the realization that asymmetric, thermal ion loss is a significant mechanism on determining a source of rotation at the edge of the plasma that then is transported into the core.  Recent publications have identified and characterized the edge rotation from the theoretical point of view and compared it to existing models.

Boedo has also made significant contributions in diagnostic development for plasmas. He is known for the development of high heat flux, fixed and reciprocating, scanning probes, such as that built for the NSTX tokamak, a rotating Langmuir probe, and also an innovative diagnostic to measure electron temperature with better than 400 kHz bandwidth.

Other contributions (invited talks, services, etc.)
 2014 APS DPP, New Orleans, Louisiana,  invited talk
 2008 EPS invited talk.
 2004 EPS, London Invited talk.
 2004 APS DPP, contributed talk.
 2001 US-European Transport Task Force, Faribanks, Alaska. Invited talk.
 1999 US-European transport task force, Portland Oregon, invited talk

Select publications

References

External links 
 Google Scholar profile

Year of birth missing (living people)
Living people
Fellows of the American Physical Society
21st-century American physicists
American plasma physicists
University of Texas at Austin alumni
Simón Bolívar University (Venezuela) alumni
University of California, San Diego faculty